In general topology and analysis, a Cauchy space is a generalization of metric spaces and uniform spaces for which the notion of Cauchy convergence still makes sense.  Cauchy spaces were introduced by H. H. Keller in 1968, as an axiomatic tool derived from the idea of a Cauchy filter, in order to study completeness in topological spaces. The category of Cauchy spaces and Cauchy continuous maps is Cartesian closed, and contains the category of proximity spaces.

Definition

A Cauchy space is a pair  consisting of a set  together a family  of (proper) filters on  having all of the following properties:
 If  and if each member of  intersects each member of  then  

Properties and definitions

Any Cauchy space is also a convergence space, where a filter  converges to  if  is Cauchy. In particular, a Cauchy space carries a natural topology.

Examples

 Any uniform space (hence any metric space, topological vector space, or topological group) is a Cauchy space; see Cauchy filter for definitions.
 A lattice-ordered group carries a natural Cauchy structure.

Category of Cauchy spaces

The natural notion of morphism between Cauchy spaces is that of a Cauchy-continuous function, a concept that had earlier been studied for uniform spaces.

See also

References

 Eva Lowen-Colebunders (1989). Function Classes of Cauchy Continuous Maps. Dekker, New York, 1989.
  

General topology